Ricky Jaipaul (born 3 March 1992) is a Trinidadian cricketer. He played in four first-class matches for Trinidad and Tobago from 2014 to 2017.

See also
 List of Trinidadian representative cricketers

References

External links
 

1992 births
Living people
Trinidad and Tobago cricketers